Mouse and Garden is a 1960 Warner Bros. Looney Tunes cartoon directed by Friz Freleng.  The Academy Award-nominated cartoon was released on July 16, 1960, and stars Sylvester. 

The title is a play on House & Garden. Sylvester is voiced by Mel Blanc, and Sam Cat by Daws Butler in the style of Frank Fontaine's "John" from The Jack Benny Program and "Crazy Guggenheim" from The Jackie Gleason Show.

Plot
Sylvester and his friend, Sam Cat are rummaging through trash cans for food, until Sylvester spots a mouse sneaking past them. After a little scuffle, the two felines agree to share the mouse for breakfast in the morning, but each frequently tries to get the mouse for himself while the other is asleep. Eventually, in one last attempt with a motorboat, it takes off with both of them, and they end up getting stranded on a tiny island. The cats kick each other repeatedly as the mouse rows past them on a jug singing Moonlight Bay.

See also
 List of American films of 1960

References

External links
 

Looney Tunes shorts
Warner Bros. Cartoons animated short films
1960 films
1960 animated films
1960 short films
Animated films about cats
Films about mice and rats
Films scored by Milt Franklyn
1960s Warner Bros. animated short films
Films with screenplays by Michael Maltese
Short films directed by Friz Freleng
1960s English-language films
Sylvester the Cat films
Films set on fictional islands